The 2019 NAIA Division I men's basketball tournament was held March 22-26 at Municipal Auditorium in Kansas City, Missouri. The 82nd annual NAIA basketball tournament features 32 teams playing in a single-elimination format. The opening game round started on March 20, and the National Championship Game was played on March 26.

Awards and honors

Leading scorer: 
Leading rebounder:
Frank Cramer Award: 
Dr. James Naismith-Emil S. Liston Sportsmanship Award: 
2019 All-Tournament Team: 
Player of the Year: 
Most consecutive tournament appearances: 
Most tournament appearances:

2019 NAIA results
Georgetown won its 3rd national championship in school history. They are the school with the most overall appearances in the tournament and 28th consecutive tournament. They are now 3-4 in the National Championship Game. They previously won in 1998 and 2013.

2019 NAIA bracket

References

NAIA Men's Basketball Championship
Tournament
NAIA Division I men's basketball tournament
NAIA Division I men's basketball tournament